Barbara E. Shaw (March 7, 1942 – December 22, 2021) was an American politician from New Hampshire.

Biography
Shaw lived in Manchester, New Hampshire, was a teacher and an assistant principal. She served in the New Hampshire House of Representatives for 22 years and also on the Manchester Board of Mayor and Aldermen since 2010 for the Democratic Party. She died from complications of surgery on December 22, 2021, at the age of 79.

References

1942 births
2021 deaths
Educators from New Hampshire
Democratic Party members of the New Hampshire House of Representatives
Politicians from Manchester, New Hampshire
New Hampshire city council members
Women city councillors in New Hampshire
Women state legislators in New Hampshire